Keamari is a neighbourhood in Karachi, Sindh, Pakistan. Keamari was originally an independent settlement that was built on a sandy ridge on the eastern side of Karachi Harbour.

History 
Keamari was a low lying island located between Manora and the city of Karachi well into the colonial era. During this time, Keamari was the landing point for all goods and people entering Karachi. Kemari's anchorage during the early colonial era was too shallow for large ships, and so those were instead forced to dock at Manora.

The 3 mile long Napier Mole Road was built in 1854 as a raised embankment which connected Karachi with Keamari. A year earlier in 1853, the Napier obelisk was built to commemorate the late Governor of Sindh, Charles Napier. The British further built a spur of the Sindh Railway to Kemari, but which did not follow Napier Mole, but instead along the east part of Chinna creek. During the colonial era, Kemari had a naval yard, a government commissariat, post office, customs and railway houses. In 1865, the 1200 foot long iron Napier Mole Bridge was built as part of an upgrade. In 1914, the Sydenham Passenger Pavilion at Kemari's Boat Basin was inaugurated by Lord Willingdon. In 1917, the imposing Mules Mansion was completed, and was designed by Iraqi-Jewish architect Moses Somake.

Neighbourhoods 
Most of the neighborhoods of the defunct Kemari Town are densely populated with two exceptions. Baba Bhit is composed of three
small islands in Karachi harbour that are home to about 5% of the town's population. Further west, Gabo Pat is mostly rural with about 10% of the town population but half of the total town area. There are small villages in the rural area of Kiamari.

Sports 
Kemari has many semi-professional football teams, including:

 Kemari Mohammadan FC
 Kemari Union FC
 Society Brothers FC (formed 2010, dissolved 2014)
 Mohammad Eleven FC
 Ayaaz Eleven FC
 Usman Shaheed FC (Shirin Jinnah Colony)
 Northern Loon FC (formed 2014, present)

Gallery

See also
Keamari Town
Keamari District
Keamari Sub-Division

References

External links
Karachi Website

Neighbourhoods of Karachi
Kiamari Town